The Mirror of Her Dreams is a novel by Stephen R. Donaldson published in 1986.

Plot summary
The Mirror of Her Dreams is a novel in which the setting is a world where mirrors are magic, and is the first novel in the Mordant's Need series.

Reception
Dave Langford reviewed The Mirror of Her Dreams for White Dwarf #82, and stated that "It kept me turning the too many pages, though I couldn't believe the Marvel Comics SF megawarrior, or the Feydeauesque scenes in which an ambiguous mage keeps unbuttoning and stroking our heroine's bosoms but never gets any further."

Reviews
Review by Faren Miller (1986) in Locus, #308 September 1986
Review by C. W. Sullivan, III (1986) in Fantasy Review, November 1986
Review by Chris Barker (1986) in Vector 135
Review by Dave Wolverton (1986) in The Leading Edge Magazine of Science Fiction and Fantasy, #12 Fall 1986
Review by E. F. Bleiler (1987) in Rod Serling's The Twilight Zone Magazine, February 1987
Review by Baird Searles (1987) in Isaac Asimov's Science Fiction Magazine, March 1987

References

1986 American novels
American fantasy novels
Del Rey books
Novels by Stephen R. Donaldson